The 1996 PBA All-Star Weekend is the annual all-star weekend of the Philippine Basketball Association (PBA). The All-Star Fans Day was held on July 26 at the Araneta Coliseum in Quezon City while the All-Star Game was held on July 28 at the Cuneta Astrodome in Pasay.

Skills Challenge Winners
Buzzer-Beater Contest: Jack Santiago (Sunkist)
Three-point Shootout: Ric-Ric Marata (Sunkist)
Slam Dunk Team Competition: Marlou Aquino and Noli Locsin (Ginebra)

All-Star Game

Rosters

Rookies-Sophomores-Juniors:
Marlou Aquino (Ginebra)
Jeffrey Cariaso (Alaska)
Bal David (Ginebra)
Kenneth Duremdes (Sunkist)
Dennis Espino (Sta. Lucia)
Rey Evangelista (Purefoods)
EJ Feihl (Ginebra)
Poch Juinio (Alaska)
Vince Hizon (Ginebra)
Noli Locsin (Ginebra)
Wilmer Ong (Ginebra)
Rodney Santos (Purefoods)
Coach: Robert Jaworski (Ginebra)

Veterans:
Johnny Abarrientos (Alaska)
Ato Agustin (Sunkist)
Nelson Asaytono (San Miguel)
Paul Alvarez (San Miguel)
Jerry Codiñera (Purefoods)
Bong Hawkins (Alaska)
Samboy Lim (San Miguel)
Vergel Meneses (Sunkist)
Jojo Lastimosa (Alaska)
Benjie Paras (Shell)
Alvin Patrimonio (Purefoods)
Dindo Pumaren (Purefoods)
Coach: Norman Black (San Miguel)

Game

References

All-Star Weekend
Philippine Basketball Association All-Star Weekend